Energy for All is the name of an initiative and partnership, both founded by the Asian Development Bank (ADB), to reduce energy poverty in Asia and the Pacific. 

The initiative aims to develop approaches for providing access to reliable and affordable energy services, and to scale them up. This includes household access to electricity from renewable energy technologies such as micro-hydro, solar, biomass, and small wind power, as well as access to clean cooking fuel, such as LPG or biogas from livestock manure. The partnership was created to allow entities from different sectors in the region to cooperate. Its stated goal is to provide access to energy to 100 million people in the region by 2015.

Working groups 

There are currently seven working groups in the partnership.

Domestic Biogas 
Convener: SNV Netherlands Development Organisation
Target: Deploy 1 million domestic biogas plants for 5 million people and develop sustainable commercial biogas sectors in 15 countries in Asia and the Pacific by 2016.

Lighting for All 
Convener: The Energy and Resource Institute (TERI)

Target: Expand access to off-grid lighting solutions for 50 million people by 2015.

Liquified Petroleum Gas 
Convener: World LP Gas Association

Target: Expand distribution of LP Gas to remote communities while creating sustainable markets.

Enterprise Development 
Convener: Sustainable Energy Association of Singapore (SEAS)

Target: Develop clean energy enterprises in the region through public-private partnership models and a network of industry associations, institutions and relevant government bodies.

The Pacific Region 
Convener: Renewable Energy and Energy Efficiency Partnership (REEEP)

Target: Scale up proven models for energy access and disseminate successful approaches throughout the  Pacific island countries.

Wind Power 
Convener: Korea Wind Energy Industry Association

Target: Deploy small wind power for electrification and productive use in remote areas in Asia and the Pacific region.

References

External links 
 The Energy for All Initiative
 The Energy for All Partnership

International sustainability organizations
Renewable energy commercialization
Energy organizations
Sustainability in Asia